South Park: Bigger, Longer & Uncut – Music from and Inspired by the Motion Picture is the soundtrack album to the film of the same name. The album was released on June 22, 1999, by Atlantic Records. The album inlay states that only the first 12 tracks on the album actually appear in the film. The remainder, described as being "inspired" by the movie, are mostly other acts performing alternate versions of those songs; however, D.V.D.A.'s "What Would Brian Boitano Do? Pt. II" and Michael McDonald's "Eyes of a Child" are played in the closing credits. The songs were all written by Trey Parker and Marc Shaiman.

Singles 
"Good Love"
 CD1
 "Good Love" – performed by Chef
 "Eyes of a Child" – performed by Michael McDonald
 "Mountain Town" – performed by the cast of ''South Park'
 CD2
 "Good Love" – performed by Chef
 "Kyle's Mom's a Big Fat Bitch" (Radio Edit) – performed by Eric Cartman and Joe C
 "What Would Brian Boitano Do?" (Cast Version) – performed by Kyle, Cartman & Stan

"Blame Canada" – promotional single only
 "Blame Canada" (main version)
 "Blame Canada (O Canada)" (main version)

"What Would Brian Boitano Do? Pt. II" – promotional single only
 "What Would Brian Boitano Do?" (Pt. II)
 "What Would Brian Boitano Do?" (Cast Version)

"Shut Yo Face (Uncle F*cka)"/"Riches to Rags (MMMKay)" [12" split]
 Side A: Trick Daddy featuring Trina & Tre+6 – "Shut Yo Face (Unclef**ka)"
 Album version – performed by Trick Daddy, Trina, & Tre+6
 Instrumental
 Acapella

 Side B: Nappy Roots – "Riches to Rags (MMMKay)"
 Radio edit – performed by Nappy Roots
 Album version
 Instrumental

Track listing 
(*): This recording not contained in the film.

Charts

Certifications

References 

1999 soundtrack albums
Atlantic Records soundtracks
1990s film soundtrack albums
South Park albums
1990s comedy albums
Comedy film soundtracks
Domestic violence in fiction
Discrimination in fiction
Prejudice in fiction
Racism in fiction